Carlos Pérez Álvarez (1 November 1971 – 5 July 2006) was a Spanish professional footballer who played as a central midfielder.

The most important part of his career was spent in Portugal, although the majority of his career was spent playing in his hometown Celta. He died at age 34 on 5 July 2006.

Club career
Born in Vigo, Province of Pontevedra, Pérez started his professional career in the hometown club RC Celta de Vigo. His stay, however, would not be a productive one, as he only totalled 16 first-team appearances over his first three seasons.

From 1994 to 1996, Pérez appeared slightly more, but never established himself as an important member of the main squad, being subsequently loaned to UD Almería from Segunda División; he played the most he had in years there, but suffered relegation. Upon his return to Celta, he made no La Liga appearances whatsoever and was released.

Pérez then took his game to Iberian Peninsula neighbours Portugal, first with G.D. Chaves. After one Primeira Liga campaign where he scored a career-best four goals (albeit with relegation), he joined another club in the north, Vitória de Guimarães.

In the summer of 2001, Pérez signed with second level team C.D. Nacional, helping them promote in his debut campaign (19 matches, two goals). He continued to feature regularly in the following two seasons, after which he returned home, joining CD Ourense, also in his native region.

Death
Settling in Pontevedra, Nigrán, after his retirement, Pérez died on 5 July 2006 after parts of his house collapsed over his body, as he was lying in a hammock. Aged only 34, he left two young children.

References

External links

1971 births
2006 deaths
Spanish footballers
Footballers from Vigo
Association football midfielders
La Liga players
Segunda División players
Segunda División B players
Tercera División players
Celta de Vigo B players
RC Celta de Vigo players
UD Almería players
CD Ourense footballers
Primeira Liga players
Liga Portugal 2 players
G.D. Chaves players
Vitória S.C. players
C.D. Nacional players
Spain under-21 international footballers
Spanish expatriate footballers
Expatriate footballers in Portugal
Spanish expatriate sportspeople in Portugal
Accidental deaths in Spain